Kouba is a suburb situated on a height just south-east of the central city of Algiers in northern Algeria.
It is home to the Kouba city council and the church of Kouba, which was built during the French colonial times. Its name refers to "Qubba", which means "dome".

Notable people

Azzedine Bousseksou
Brahim Boushaki
Mohamed Missouri

References 

Suburbs of Algiers
Communes of Algiers Province
Algiers Province